Arthur Ruysschaert (born 21 February 1910 in Bruges – died 10 January 1995 in Bruges) was a Belgian footballer. His position on the field was striker.

Ruysschaert made his debut at the highest level of Belgian football on 18 April 1926, when he played with Cercle Brugge in a 3–2 home win against RSC Anderlecht. With Cercle he won the league twice (1927, 1930), the cup once (1927) and the second division once (1938).

Arthur Ruysschaert is the only player who is in the top 10 most appearances ever as well as in the top 10 most goals ever for Cercle Brugge.

He ended his career with Belgian coast side VG Oostende. After his footballing career, Ruysschaert became youth coach at Cercle Brugge. He also became ad interim manager of Cercle during the 1953–54 season because of the suspension of Louis Versyp.

External links
Cerclemuseum.be 

1910 births
1995 deaths
Footballers from Bruges
Association football forwards
Belgian footballers
Belgian Pro League players
Cercle Brugge K.S.V. players
Belgian football managers
Cercle Brugge K.S.V. managers